St. Nicholas Church is an ancient East Roman basilica church in the ancient city of Myra, now a museum located in modern Demre, Antalya Province, Turkey. It was built above the burial place of St Nicholas, a 4th-century Christian bishop of Myra, an important religious figure for Eastern Orthodox Christians and Roman Catholics and the historical inspiration for Santa Claus. Its use dated from its 6th century construction for the state church of the Roman Empire by Justinian the Great. The basilica is on UNESCO's tentative list to become a World Heritage Site.

History
The church was built in AD 520 on the foundations of an older Christian church where Saint Nicholas had served as a bishop. Justinian I contributed to the reconstruction. It is noted for its remarkable wall frescos, and its architectural and religious significance.

Over time the church was flooded and filled with silt. In 1862 it was restored by Russian Emperor Nicholas I, who added a tower and made other changes to its Byzantine architecture. The church continued to function until its final abandonment by the Eastern Orthodox Church in 1923, when the remaining Greeks of Demre were required to leave by the Population exchange between Greece and Turkey.

Archaeological excavations
Archaeological excavations in the Church started in 1988 directed by Prof. S. Yıldız Ötüken of Hacettepe University, Ankara, Turkey. The work has revealed some of the northern section of the monastery complex, and also the small chapels around the nave, one of which notably contains vibrant frescoes detailing the life and miracles of the saint, and a desecrated sarcophagus which is thought to be the original burial place from which his remains were forcibly translated to Bari in 1087.

Decoration 
The northeast annex arcade contains the only example of St Nicholas's life cycle on ancient frescos in Turkey.

Opus sectile 
Parts of the church preserve opus sectile decoration.

Liturgy
The Orthodox Liturgy is occasionally celebrated in the church on 6 December.

See also
History of Roman and Byzantine domes

References

External links 
 sacred-destinations.com
 Hundreds of pictures of church and frescos

520 establishments
520s establishments in the Byzantine Empire
6th-century churches
Buildings and structures in Antalya Province
Tourist attractions in Antalya Province
World Heritage Tentative List for Turkey
Former churches in Turkey
Saint Nicholas